Motivation is the reason for which humans and other animals initiate, continue, or terminate a behavior at a given time. Motivational states are commonly understood as forces acting within the agent that create a disposition to engage in goal-directed behavior. It is often held that different mental states compete with each other and that only the strongest state determines behavior. This means that we can be motivated to do something without actually doing it. The paradigmatic mental state providing motivation is desire. But various other states, such as beliefs about what one ought to do or intentions, may also provide motivation. Motivation is derived from the word 'motive', which denotes a person's needs, desires, wants, or urges. It is the process of motivating individuals to take action in order to achieve a goal. The psychological elements fueling people's behavior in the context of job goals might include a desire for money.

Various competing theories have been proposed concerning the content of motivational states. They are known as content theories and aim to describe what goals usually or always motivate people. Abraham Maslow's hierarchy of needs and the ERG theory, for example, posit that humans have certain needs, which are responsible for motivation. Some of these needs, like for food and water, are more basic than other needs, such as for respect from others. On this view, the higher needs can only provide motivation once the lower needs have been fulfilled. Behaviorist theories try to explain behavior solely in terms of the relation between the situation and external, observable behavior without explicit reference to conscious mental states.

Motivation may be either intrinsic, if the activity is desired because it is inherently interesting or enjoyable, or extrinsic, if the agent's goal is an external reward distinct from the activity itself. It has been argued that intrinsic motivation has more beneficial outcomes than extrinsic motivation. Motivational states can also be categorized according to whether the agent is fully aware of why he acts the way he does or not, referred to as conscious and unconscious motivation. Motivation is closely related to practical rationality. A central idea in this field is that we should be motivated to perform an action if we believe that we should perform it. Failing to fulfill this requirement results in cases of irrationality, known as akrasia or weakness of the will, in which there is a discrepancy between our beliefs about what we should do and our actions.

Research on motivation has been employed in various fields. In the field of business, a central question concerns work motivation, for example, what measures an employer can use to ensure that his employees are motivated. Motivation is also of particular interest to educational psychologists because of its crucial role in student learning. Specific interest has been given to the effects of intrinsic and extrinsic motivation in this field.

Definition 
"Motivation" is commonly defined as what explains why people or animals initiate, continue or terminate a certain behavior at a particular time. Motivational states come in various degrees of strength. The higher the degree, the more likely it is that the state has an influence on behavior. This is often linked to forces acting from within the agent that result in goal-directed behavior. One problem with defining motivation in terms of internal forces is that it is very difficult to measure them, which is why empirically-minded theorists often prefer definitions that are more closely linked to observable behavior. One approach is to define motivation in terms of the flexibility of the animal's behavior. This flexibility involves goal-directed behavior that changes as the animal learns through new experiences. Rats, for example, can learn to traverse through complicated mazes in order to satisfy their hunger. The feeding behavior of flies, on the other hand, is not flexible in this sense. On this view, we are justified to ascribe motivational states to rats but not to flies. But it has been argued that there are cases of motivation without flexible behavior. A totally paralyzed person, for example, could still have motivation despite being unable to engage in behavior. This means that flexibility may still be a sufficient but not a necessary mark of motivation. Some definitions stress the continuity between human and animal motivation but others draw a clear distinction between the two. This is often motivated by the idea that human agents act for reasons and commit themselves to the intentions they form while animals just follow their strongest desire. Causalist definitions stress the causal relation between motivation and the resulting behavior. Non-causalist definitions, on the other hand, hold that motivation explains behavior in a non-causal way.

Motivation and mental states 
Behaviorists have tried to explain motivation solely in terms of the relation between the situation and external, observable behavior. But the same entity often behaves differently despite being in the same situation as before. This suggests that explanation needs to make reference to internal states of the entity that mediate the link between stimulus and response. Among these internal states, psychologists and philosophers are most interested in mental states. The paradigmatic mental state providing motivation is desire. But it has been argued that various other states, such as beliefs about what one ought to do or intentions, can also provide motivation. The absence of motivation might result in mental diseases like depression.

An important distinction is between states that provide motivation whenever they are present, sometimes referred to as "essentially motivation-constituting attitudes", while other states provide motivation contingent on certain circumstances or other states. It has been argued that a desire to perform an action, a so-called action-desire, always provides motivation. This is even the case if the agent decides against performing the action because there are other more pressing issues. An instrumental belief about how to reach a certain goal, on the other hand, provides motivation contingent on the agent currently having this goal. We can desire many things besides actions, like that our favorite soccer team wins their next match or that world peace is established. Whether these desires provide motivation depends, among other things, on whether the agent has the ability to contribute to their realization. While some theorists accept the idea that desire is essential to motivation, others have argued that we can act even without desires. The motivation may instead be based, for example, on rational deliberation. On this view, attending a painful root canal treatment is in most cases motivated by deliberation and not by a desire to do so. So desire may not be essential to motivation. But it is open to opponents of the thesis that there is motivation without desires to reject the analysis of such examples. Instead, they may argue that attending the root canal treatment is desired in some sense, even if there is also a very vivid desire present against doing so.

Another important distinction is between occurrent and standing desires. Occurrent desires are either conscious or otherwise causally active, in contrast to standing desires, which exist somewhere in the back of one's mind. If Dhanvi is busy convincing her friend to go hiking this weekend, for example, then her desire to go hiking is occurrent. But many of her other desires, like to sell her old car or to talk with her boss about a promotion, are merely standing during this conversation. Only occurrent desires can act as sources of motivation. But not all occurrent desires are conscious. This leaves open the possibility of unconscious motivation.

Some psychological theories claim that motivation exists purely within the individual, but socio-cultural theories express motivation as an outcome of participation in actions and activities within the cultural context of social groups.

Strength of desire and action 
Some theorists, often from a Humean tradition, deny that states other than desires can motivate us. When such a view is combined with the idea that desires come in degrees, it can naturally lead to the thesis that we always follow our strongest desire. This theory can be modified in the way that we always follow the course of action with the highest net force of motivation. This accounts for cases where several weaker desires all recommend the same course of action and together trump the strongest desire. Various types of objections have been raised against this thesis. Some base their arguments on the assumption that we have free will, meaning that it is up to the agent what we do. From this position, it is natural to reject a point of view that lets behavior be determined by desires and not by the agent. Others point to counterexamples, like when the agent acts out of a sense of duty even though he has a much stronger desire to do something else. One line of argumentation holds that there is an important difference between the motivation based on a desire and an intention to act: an intention involves some kind of commitment to or identification with the intended course of action. This happens on the side of the agent and is not present in regular desires. This approach can be combined with the view that desires somehow contribute to the formation of intentions based on their strength. It has been argued that this distinction is important for the difference between human agency and animal behavior. On this view, animals automatically follow their strongest desire while human agents act according to their intention which may or may not coincide with their strongest desire.

Content theories 

Theories articulating the content of motivation: what kinds of things people find motivating are among the earliest theories in motivation research history. Because content theories focus on which categories of goal (needs) motivate people, content theories are related to need theories.

Maslow's hierarchy of needs 

Content theory of human motivation includes both Abraham Maslow's hierarchy of needs and Herzberg's two-factor theory. Maslow's thesis is based on the idea that we are driven by our basic human needs. Maslow's theory is one of the most widely discussed theories of motivation. Furthermore, if some of our most basic requirements are not addressed, we may be unable to advance and meet our other needs. Abraham Maslow believed that man is inherently good and argued that individuals possess a constantly growing inner drive that has great potential. The needs hierarchy system is a commonly used scheme for classifying human motives. Maslow's hierarchy of needs emphasizes certain characteristics like family and community that involve the needs to be met. The basic needs, safety, love and belonging, and esteem have to be met first in order for the individual to actually reach self-actualization. The needs can overlap within the pyramid, but the lower needs have to be met first in order to move up. Some basic needs can include food and shelter. The need of safety has to do with receiving protection. For the individual to feel love and belonging, they have to feel some type of attachment by giving and receiving love. Having competence and control in personal life has to do with meeting the need of esteem. Not being able to meet the lower and higher needs can have a detrimental effect on mental health. This could lead to symptoms of depression, and lower self-esteem during adolescent years. If safety needs are not met during adolescence, then the individual will have less confidence. A study found that just having support from the community, friends can lead to decreased emotional challenges. It is important to satisfy these needs in order to reduce emotional and mental challenges over time.

Maslow (1954) developed the hierarchy of needs consisting of five hierarchic classes. According to Maslow, people are motivated by unsatisfied needs. The needs, listed from basic (lowest-earliest) to most complex (highest-latest), are as follows:

Physiology (hunger, thirst, sleep, etc.)
Safety/Security/Shelter/Health
Social/Love/Friendship
Self-esteem/Recognition/Achievement
Self-actualization/achievement of full potential

The basic requirements build upon the first step in the pyramid: physiology. If there are deficits on this level, all behavior will be oriented to satisfy this deficit. Essentially, if someone has not slept or eaten adequately, they would not be interested in their self-esteem desires. Subsequently, people that have the second level, awakens a need for security and so on and so forth. After securing those two levels, the motives shift to the social sphere, the third level. Psychological requirements comprise the fourth level, while the top of the hierarchy consists of self-realization and self-actualization.

Maslow's hierarchy of needs theory can be summarized as follows:

 Human beings have wants and desires which, when unsatisfied, may influence behavior.
 Differing levels of importance to human life are reflected in a hierarchical structure of needs.
 Needs at higher levels in the hierarchy are held in abeyance until lower-level needs are at least minimally satisfied.
 Needs at higher levels of the hierarchy are associated with individuality, humanness, and psychological health.

Herzberg's two-factor theory 

Frederick Herzberg's two-factor theory concludes that certain factors in the workplace result in job satisfaction (motivators), while others (hygiene factors), if absent, lead to dissatisfaction but are not related to satisfaction. The name hygiene factors are used because, like hygiene, the presence will not improve health, but absence can cause health deterioration.

The factors that motivate people can change over their lifetime. Some claimed motivating factors (satisfiers) were: Achievement, recognition, work itself, responsibility, advancement, and growth. Some hygiene factors (dissatisfiers) were: company policy, supervision, working conditions, interpersonal relations, salary, status, job security, and personal life.

Alderfer's ERG theory 

Alderfer, building on Maslow's hierarchy of needs, posited that needs identified by Maslow exist in three groups of core needs—existence, relatedness, and growth, hence the label: ERG theory. The existence group is concerned with providing our basic material existence requirements. They include the items that Maslow considered to be physiological and safety needs. The second group of needs is relatedness—the desire we have to maintain important personal relationships. These social and status desires require interaction with others if they are to be satisfied, and they align with Maslow's social need and the external component of Maslow's esteem classification. Finally, Alderfer isolates growth needs as an intrinsic desire for personal development. All these needs should be fulfilled to greater wholeness as a human being.

Self-determination theory
Self-determination theory is an approach to human motivation and personality that uses traditional empirical methods while employing an organismic metatheory that highlights the importance of humans' evolved inner resources for personality development and behavioral self-regulation (Ryan, Kuhn, & Deci, 1997). It takes a look into people's psychological needs and growth tendencies that reveal their personality and level of self-determination. Competence, relatedness, and autonomy are important conditions that play a huge part in one's motivation and engagement in activities, because it determines a person's well-being. The social environment, with the correct amount of support, can help fulfill basic psychological needs. These basic psychological needs are autonomy, competence, and relatedness. These basic needs can create behaviors that result from personal support which leads to being engaged in a certain environment and provides relationships that are important. Two types of motivation found in the self-determination theory are called amotivation and autonomous motivation. These types of motivations can lead to intrinsic and extrinsic actions. The amotivation can derive from feelings of inadequacy which leads to having a lack of motivation. The person feels their environment is controlled through monitoring and rewards. The person only feels motivation because of external rewards or to avoid punishment. On the other hand, autonomous motivation comes from the person's own lifestyle and engaging in a task is done innately. Having a supportive social environment can help bring out behaviors from autonomous motivations.

Classical and operant conditioning

In classical (or respondent) conditioning, behaviour is understood as responses triggered by certain environmental or physical stimuli. They can be unconditioned, such as in-born reflexes, or learned through the pairing of an unconditioned stimulus with a different stimulus, which then becomes a conditioned stimulus. In relation to motivation, classical conditioning might be seen as one explanation as to why an individual performs certain responses and behaviors in certain situations. For instance, a dentist might wonder why a patient does not seem motivated to show up for an appointment, with the explanation being that the patient has associated the dentist (conditioned stimulus) with the pain (unconditioned stimulus) that elicits a fear response (conditioned response), leading to the patient being reluctant to visit the dentist.

In operant conditioning, the type and frequency of behaviour are determined mainly by its consequences. If a certain behaviour, in the presence of a certain stimulus, is followed by a desirable consequence (a reinforcer), the emitted behaviour will increase in frequency in the future, in the presence of the stimulus that preceded the behaviour (or a similar one). Conversely, if the behaviour is followed by something undesirable (a punisher), the behaviour is less likely to occur in the presence of the stimulus. In a similar manner, the removal of a stimulus directly following the behaviour might either increase or decrease the frequency of that behaviour in the future (negative reinforcement or punishment). For instance, a student that gained praise and a good grade after turning in a paper might seem more motivated in writing papers in the future (positive reinforcement); if the same student put in a lot of work on a task without getting any praise for it, he or she might seem less motivated to do school work in the future (negative punishment). If a student who causes trouble in class gets punished with something he or she dislikes, such as detention (positive punishment), that behaviour would decrease in the future. The student might seem more motivated to behave in class, presumably in order to avoid further detention (negative reinforcement).

The strength of reinforcement or punishment is dependent on schedule and timing. A reinforcer or punisher affects the future frequency of a behaviour most strongly if it occurs within seconds of the behaviour. A behaviour that is reinforced intermittently, at unpredictable intervals, will be more robust and persistent compared to one that is reinforced every time the behaviour is performed. For example, if the misbehaving student in the above example was punished a week after the troublesome behaviour, that might not affect future behaviour.

In addition to these basic principles, environmental stimuli also affect behavior. Behaviour is punished or reinforced in the context of whatever stimuli were present just before the behaviour was performed, which means that a particular behaviour might not be affected in every environmental context, or situation, after it is punished or reinforced in one specific context. A lack of praise for school-related behaviour might, for instance, not decrease after-school sports-related behaviour that is usually reinforced by praise.

The various mechanisms of operant conditioning may be used to understand the motivation for various behaviours by examining what happens just after the behaviour (the consequence), in what context the behaviour is performed or not performed (the antecedent), and under what circumstances (motivating operators).

Incentive motivation

Incentive theory is a specific theory of motivation, derived partly from behaviorist principles of reinforcement, which concerns an incentive or motive to do something. The most common incentive would be a compensation. Compensation can be tangible or intangible; it helps in motivating the employees in their corporate lives, students in academics, and inspires people to do more and more to achieve profitability in every field. Studies show that if the person receives the reward immediately, the effect is greater, and decreases as delay lengthens. Repetitive action-reward combination can cause the action to become a habit

"Reinforcers and reinforcement principles of behaviour differ from the hypothetical construct of reward." A reinforcer is anything that follows an action, with the intention that the action will now occur more frequently. From this perspective, the concept of distinguishing between intrinsic and extrinsic forces is irrelevant.

Incentive theory in psychology treats motivation and behaviour of the individual as they are influenced by beliefs, such as engaging in activities that are expected to be profitable. Incentive theory is promoted by behavioral psychologists, such as B.F. Skinner. Incentive theory is especially supported by Skinner in his philosophy of Radical behaviorism, meaning that a person's actions always have social ramifications: and if actions are positively received people are more likely to act in this manner, or if negatively received people are less likely to act in this manner.

Incentive theory distinguishes itself from other motivation theories, such as drive theory, in the direction of the motivation. In incentive theory, stimuli "attract" a person towards them, and push them towards the stimulus. In terms of behaviorism, incentive theory involves positive reinforcement: the reinforcing stimulus has been conditioned to make the person happier. As opposed to in drive theory, which involves negative reinforcement: a stimulus has been associated with the removal of the punishment—the lack of homeostasis in the body. For example, a person has come to know that if they eat when hungry, it will eliminate that negative feeling of hunger, or if they drink when thirsty, it will eliminate that negative feeling of thirst.

Motivating operations
Motivating operations, MOs, relate to the field of motivation in that they help improve understanding aspects of behavior that are not covered by operant conditioning. In operant conditioning, the function of the reinforcer is to influence future behavior. The presence of a stimulus believed to function as a reinforcer does not according to this terminology explain the current behavior of an organism – only previous instances of reinforcement of that behavior (in the same or similar situations) do. Through the behavior-altering effect of MOs, it is possible to affect the current behavior of an individual, giving another piece of the puzzle of motivation.

Motivating operations are factors that affect learned behavior in a certain context. MOs have two effects: a value-altering effect, which increases or decreases the efficiency of a reinforcer, and a behavior-altering effect, which modifies learned behavior that has previously been punished or reinforced by a particular stimulus.

When a motivating operation causes an increase in the effectiveness of a reinforcer or amplifies a learned behaviour in some way (such as increasing frequency, intensity, duration, or speed of the behavior), it functions as an establishing operation, EO. A common example of this would be food deprivation, which functions as an EO in relation to food: the food-deprived organism will perform behaviors previously related to the acquisition of food more intensely, frequently, longer, or faster in the presence of food, and those behaviours would be especially strongly reinforced. For instance, a fast-food worker earning a minimal wage, forced to work more than one job to make ends meet, would be highly motivated by a pay raise, because of the current deprivation of money (a conditioned establishing operation). The worker would work hard to try to achieve the raise, and getting the raise would function as an especially strong reinforcer of work behavior.

Conversely, a motivating operation that causes a decrease in the effectiveness of a reinforcer, or diminishes a learned behavior related to the reinforcer, functions as an abolishing operation, AO. Again using the example of food, satiation of food prior to the presentation of a food stimulus would produce a decrease on food-related behaviors, and diminish or completely abolish the reinforcing effect of acquiring and ingesting the food. Consider the board of a large investment bank, concerned with a too-small profit margin, deciding to give the CEO a new incentive package in order to motivate him to increase firm profits. If the CEO already has a lot of money, the incentive package might not be a very good way to motivate him, because he would be satiated on the money. Getting even more money wouldn't be a strong reinforcer for profit-increasing behavior, and wouldn't elicit increased intensity, frequency, or duration of profit-increasing behavior.

William McDougall's purposive psychology

Purposive psychology, also known as hormic psychology, emphasizes that actions by people are done for a purpose or with specific intent. This is a behaviorist theory that states behavior is a reflex because of internal or intrinsic motivation.

Drives 

A drive or desire can be described as an urge that activates behavior that is aimed at a goal or an incentive. These drives are thought to originate within the individual and may not require external stimuli to encourage the behavior. Basic drives could be sparked by urges such as hunger, which motivates a person to seek food whereas more subtle drives might be the desire for praise and approval, which motivates a person to behave in a manner pleasing to others.

Another basic drive is the sexual drive which, like food, motivates us because it is essential to our survival. The desire for sex is wired deep into the brain of all human beings as glands secrete hormones that travel through the blood to the brain and stimulates the onset of sexual desire. The hormone involved in the initial onset of sexual desire is called dehydroepiandrosterone (DHEA). The hormonal basis of both men and women's sex drives is testosterone.

Types of motivation

Intrinsic and extrinsic

Intrinsic

Intrinsic motivation exists within the individual and is driven by satisfying internal rewards rather than relying on external pressures or extrinsic rewards. It involves an interest in or enjoyment of the activity itself. For example, an athlete may enjoy playing football for the experience, rather than for an award. Activities involving their own inherent reward provide motivation that is not dependent on external rewards. Pursuing challenges and goals comes easier and is more enjoyable when one is intrinsically motivated to complete a certain objective; for example, because the individual is more interested in learning, rather than achieving the goal. It has been argued that intrinsic motivation is associated with increased subjective well-being and that it is important for cognitive, social, and physical development. It can also be observed in animal behaviour, for example, when organisms engage in playful and curiosity-driven behaviours in the absence of reward.

According to some theorists, the two necessary elements for intrinsic motivation are self-determination or autonomy and competence. On this view, the cause of the behaviour must be internal, and the individual who engages in the behaviour must perceive that the task increases their competence. Social-contextual events like feedback and reinforcement can cause feelings of competence and therefore contribute to intrinsic motivation. However, feelings of competence will not increase intrinsic motivation if there is no sense of autonomy. In situations where choices, feelings, and opportunities are present, intrinsic motivation is increased because people feel a greater sense of autonomy. Some studies suggest that there is a negative correlation between external rewards and intrinsic motivation, i.e. that by providing high external rewards for an activity, the intrinsic motivation for engaging in it tends to be lower.

Various studies have focused on the intrinsic motivation of students. They suggest that intrinsically motivated students are more likely to engage in the task willingly as well as work to improve their skills, which tends to increase their capabilities. Students are likely to be intrinsically motivated if they...
 attribute their educational results to factors under their own control, also known as autonomy or locus of control
 believe they have the skills to be effective agents in reaching their desired goals, also known as self-efficacy beliefs
are interested in mastering a topic, not just in achieving good grades

Traditionally, researchers thought of motivations to use computer systems to be primarily driven by extrinsic purposes; however, many modern systems have their use driven primarily by intrinsic motivations. Examples of such systems used primarily to fulfill users' intrinsic motivations include online gaming, virtual worlds, online shopping, learning/education, online dating, digital music repositories, social networking, online pornography, gamified systems, and general gamification.

Intrinsic motivation tends to be more long-lasting, self-sustaining, and satisfying than extrinsic motivation. For this reason, many efforts in education aim to modify intrinsic motivation with the goal of promoting student learning performance and creativity. But various studies suggest that intrinsic motivation is hard to modify or inspire. Attempts to recruit existing intrinsic motivators require an individualized approach: they involve identifying and making relevant the different motivators needed to motivate different students. This usually requires additional skills from the instructor. Mindfulness has been found to be an intraindividual factor that supports autonomous motivation and thereby contributes to intrinsic motivation.

Extrinsic
Extrinsic motivation occurs when an individual is driven by external influences. These can be either rewarding (money, good grades, fame, etc.) or punishing (threat of punishment, pain, etc.). The distinction between intrinsic and extrinsic motivation lies within the driving force behind the action. When someone is intrinsically motivated, they engage in an activity because it is inherently interesting, enjoyable, or satisfying. With extrinsic motivation, the agent's goal is a desired outcome distinct from the activity itself. The agent can have both intrinsic and extrinsic motives for the same activity, but usually one type of motivation outweighs the other. Playing tennis to receive an award is an example of extrinsic motivation, while playing because one enjoys the game involves intrinsic motivation.

Some studies indicate that extrinsic rewards can lead to overjustification and a subsequent reduction in intrinsic motivation. In one study demonstrating this effect, children who expected to be (and were) rewarded with a ribbon and a gold star for drawing pictures spent less time playing with the drawing materials in subsequent observations than children who were assigned to an unexpected reward condition. This indicates that there is a tendency to care less about the activity itself if a reward is expected. However, other studies suggest that positive or negative extrinsic rewards can also increase intrinsic motivation. This leads us to the assumption that the effects of extrinsic motivation on intrinsic motivation may depend on the type of reward.

According to the article "Self-Determination Theory and the Facilitation of Intrinsic Motivation, Social Development and Well-Being", a lot of what we do after childhood is not inspired by intrinsic motivation because we are not solely doing things anymore to satisfy our intrinsic motivations, but is instead done more to satisfy our extrinsic motivations since we must adhere to social pressures which force us to do things that are not intrinsically motivating.

One advantage of extrinsic motivation is that it can be used relatively easily to motivate other people to work towards goal completion. One disadvantage is that the quality of work may need to be monitored since the agent might otherwise not be motivated to do a good job. Extrinsic motivation fueling engagement in the activity soon ceases once external rewards are removed. It has also been suggested that extrinsic motivators may diminish in value over time, making it more difficult to motivate the same person in the future.

Johnmarshall Reeve distinguishes between four types of extrinsic motivation that involve different degrees of autonomy: external regulation, introjected regulation, identified regulation, and integrated regulation. External regulation is the least autonomous form of extrinsic motivation. In it, only the consequence of an action counts for the agent. For example, if a student wants a good grade, they are motivated to study for that grade. Introjected regulation arises from the agent's impression of what they should do. For instance, a student knows that they "should" study and does not want to feel the guilt that comes with not studying, so they do. Identified regulation comes from what the agent believes is personally important. In the example of the student, they may have an understanding that studying is important to their success and will pursue their studies for that reason. Integrated regulation is the most autonomous form of extrinsic motivation and occurs when motivation arises from the impression of personal identity. This type of extrinsic motivation is very close to intrinsic motivation, but is not quite there yet. This is because the individual is motivated to engage in an activity by how well it expresses their values instead of by pure interest and enjoyment. In this case, a student studies because doing so expresses their core values and reflects how they see themselves as a person. A student intrinsically motivated to study would do so purely because they thought studying was interesting and fun.

Unconscious and conscious 

Conscious motivation involves motives of which the agent is aware. In the case of unconscious motivation, on the other hand, the agent may be partially or fully unaware of why they act the way they do.

Unconscious 
The conscious–unconscious distinction plays an important role in Sigmund Freud's psychoanalytical theories. According to him, the unconscious contains various repressed parts of the mind, like anxiety-inducing thoughts and socially unacceptable ideas. He identifies censorship as a force that keeps the repressed parts from entering consciousness. But unconscious instinctual impulses can nonetheless have a great influence on behavior in the form of unconscious motivation. When these instincts serve as a motive, the person is only aware of the goal of the motive, and not its actual source. Freud divides these instincts into sexual instincts, death instincts, and ego or self-preservation instincts. Sexual instincts are those that motivate humans to stay alive and ensure the continuation of mankind. On the other hand, Freud also maintains that humans have an inherent drive for self-destruction: the death instinct. Similar to the devil and angel that everyone has on their shoulder, the sexual instinct and death instinct are constantly battling each other to both be satisfied. The death instinct can be closely related to Freud's other concept, the id, which is our need to experience pleasure immediately, regardless of the consequences. The last type of instinct that contributes to motivation is the ego or self-preservation instinct. This instinct is geared towards assuring that a person feels validated in whatever behavior or thought they have. The mental censor, or door between the unconscious and preconscious, helps satisfy this instinct. For example, one may be sexually attracted to a person, due to their sexual instinct, but the self-preservation instinct prevents them to act on this urge until that person finds that it is socially acceptable to do so. Quite similarly to his psychic theory that deals with the id, ego, and superego, Freud's theory of instincts highlights the interdependence of these three instincts. All three serve as checks and balances system to control what instincts are acted on and what behaviors are used to satisfy as many of them at once.

Priming is another source of unconscious motivation. It is a phenomenon whereby exposure to one stimulus influences a response to a subsequent stimulus, without conscious guidance or intention. For example, when someone is exposed to the word "cancer", they are afterward less likely to smoke a cigarette offered to them. There are various forms of priming, but visual and semantic priming are the most relevant for motivation. Because of this link to external stimuli, priming is closely related to exposure theory, which states that people tend to like things that they have been exposed to before. This is used by advertising companies to get people to buy their products. In product placements in movies and TV shows, for example, we see a product in our favorite movie, which makes us more inclined to buy that product when we see it again. Another example comes from former drug users, who are more tempted to relapse when exposed to stimuli associated with the drug.

Conscious 

Freud relied heavily upon the theories of unconscious motivation as explained above. This approach has been criticized by Gordan Allport, who holds that conscious motives are the main source of motivation.

Neuroscience

Two parts usually define motivation as a desire to act: the directional (such as directed towards a positive stimulus or away from a negative one) and the activated "seeking phase" and consummatory "liking phase". This type of motivation has neurobiological roots in the basal ganglia and mesolimbic (dopaminergic) pathways. Activated "seeking" behaviour, such as locomotor activity, is influenced by dopaminergic drugs, and microdialysis experiments reveal that dopamine is released during the anticipation of a reward. The "wanting behaviour" associated with a rewarding stimulus can be increased by microinjections of dopamine and dopaminergic drugs in the dorsorostral nucleus accumbens and posterior ventral pallidum. Opioid injections in this area produce pleasure; however, outside of these hedonic hotspots, they create an increased desire. Furthermore, depletion or inhibition of dopamine in neurons of the nucleus accumbens decreases appetitive but not consummatory behaviour. Dopamine, further implicated in motivation as administration of amphetamine, increases the breakpoint in a progressive ratio self-reinforcement schedule; subjects will be willing to go to greater lengths (e.g. press a lever more times) to obtain a reward.

In situations where memory influences the motivational state, the hippocampus is activated. This can be apparent in circumstances where contextual details are needed to achieve the desired goals.

Motivational reasons and rationality 
Motivational reasons are practical reasons an agent has for favoring a certain course of action. They are contrasted with normative reasons, which determine what the agent should do from an impartial point of view. For example, Jane suffers from high blood pressure, which is a normative reason not to have a big piece of chocolate cake. Its deliciousness, on the other hand, is Jane's motivating reason to have a serving anyway. We can have normative reasons without being aware of them, which is not the case for motivating reasons. It is possible for unconscious states to affect our behavior in various ways. But these states and their contents are not considered motivating reasons in such cases. Taken in the widest sense, there are forms of motivation that do not involve motivating reasons. A second difference is that normative reasons are factive while motivating reasons may deceive the agent. So having high blood pressure can only be a normative reason for Jane if she actually has high blood pressure. But the cake's deliciousness can be a motivating reason even if the cake is not delicious at all. In this case, the motivation is based on a false belief. But ideally, motivational reasons and normative reasons coincide: the agent is motivated by facts determining what he should do.

A closely related issue concerns the relation between what we believe we ought to do, so-called ought-beliefs, and what we are motivated to do or actually intend to do. Philosopher John Broome holds that this relation is at the core of enkratic rationality: "Rationality requires of you that, if you believe you ought to F, then you intend to F". He thinks that the process of reasoning is responsible for getting our intentions in line with our ought-beliefs. The requirements of rationality are not always fulfilled, resulting in cases of irrationality. A person is said to suffer from akrasia or weakness of the will if they fail to satisfy the enkratic requirement, i.e. if they do something different from what they believe they should do. An author who believes he ought to work on his new book but ends up watching TV instead is an example of a case of akrasia. Accidie is a closely related phenomenon in which the agent believes that there is something important to be done but lacks any motivation to engage in this action due to listlessness.

Practical applications

The control of motivation is only understood to a limited extent. There are many different approaches to motivation training, but many of these are considered pseudoscientific by critics. To understand how to control motivation it is first necessary to understand why many people lack motivation.

Like any theory, motivational theory makes predictions about what will work in practice. For instance, Douglas McGregor's Theory Y makes the assumption that the average person not only accepts, but also seeks out responsibility, enjoys doing work and, therefore, is more satisfied when they have a wider range of work to do. The practical implication is that, as a firm gives individuals greater responsibilities, they will feel a greater sense of satisfaction and, subsequently, more commitment to the organization. Likewise, allocating more work is predicted to increase engagement. Additionally, Malone argues that the delegation of responsibility encourages motivation because employees have creative control over their work and increase productivity as many people can work collaboratively to solve a problem rather than just one manager tackling it alone. Others have argued that participation in decision making boosts morale and commitment to the organization, subsequently increasing productivity. Likewise, if teams and membership increase motivation (as reported in the classic Hawthorn Western Electric Company studies) incorporating teams make provide incentives to work. In general, motivation theory is often applied to employee motivation.

Applications in business 

Within Maslow's hierarchy of needs (first proposed in 1943), at lower levels (such as physiological needs) money functions as a motivator; however, it tends to have a motivating effect on staff that lasts only for a short period (in accordance with Herzberg's two-factor model of motivation of 1959). At higher levels of the hierarchy, praise, respect, recognition, empowerment, and a sense of belonging are far more powerful motivators than money, as both Abraham Maslow's theory of motivation and Douglas McGregor's theory X and theory Y (originating in the 1950s and pertaining to the theory of leadership) suggest.

According to Maslow, people are motivated by unsatisfied needs. The lower-level needs (such as physiological and safety needs) must be satisfied before addressing higher-level needs. One can relate to Maslow's Hierarchy of Needs theory with employee motivation. For example, if managers attempt to motivate their employees by satisfying their needs, according to Maslow, they should try to satisfy the lower-level needs before trying to satisfy the upper-level needs – otherwise the employees will not become motivated. Managers should also remember that not everyone will be satisfied with the same needs. A good manager will try to figure out which levels of needs are relevant to a given individual or employee.

Maslow places money at the lowest level of the hierarchy and postulates other needs as better motivators to staff. McGregor places money in his Theory X category and regards it as a poor motivator. Praise and recognition (placed in the Theory Y category) are considered stronger motivators than money.

 Motivated employees always look for better ways to do a job.
 Motivated employees are more quality-oriented.
 Motivated workers are more productive.

The average workplace lies about midway between the extremes of high threat and high opportunity. Motivation by threat is a dead-end strategy, and naturally, staff are more attracted to the opportunity side of the motivation curve than the threat side. Lawrence Steinmetz (1983) sees motivation as a powerful tool in the work environment that can lead to employees working at their most efficient levels of production. Nonetheless, Steinmetz also discusses three common character-types of subordinates—ascendant, indifferent, and ambivalent—who all react and interact uniquely, and must be treated, managed, and motivated accordingly. An effective leader must understand how to manage all characters, and more importantly, the manager must utilize avenues that allow room for employees to work, grow, and find answers independently.

A classic study at Vauxhall Motors' UK manufacturing plant challenged the assumptions of Maslow and Herzberg were by. Goldthorpe et al. (1968) introduced the concept of orientation to work and distinguished three main orientations:

 instrumental (with work seen as a means to an end)
 bureaucratic (where work serves as a source of status, security, and immediate reward)
 solidaristic (which prioritizes group loyalty)

Other theories expanded and extended those of Maslow and Herzberg. These included the 1930s force-field analysis of Kurt Lewin, Edwin A. Locke's goal-setting theory (mid-1960s onwards) and Victor Vroom's expectancy theory of 1964. These tend to stress cultural differences and the fact that different factors tend to motivate individuals at different times.

According to the system of scientific management developed by Frederick Winslow Taylor (1856–1915), pay alone determines a worker's motivation, and therefore management need not consider psychological or social aspects of work. In essence, scientific management bases human motivation wholly on extrinsic rewards and discards the idea of intrinsic rewards.

In contrast, David McClelland (1917–1998) believed that workers could not be motivated by the mere need for money—in fact, extrinsic motivation (e.g., money) could extinguish intrinsic motivation such as achievement motivation, though money could be used as an indicator of success for various motives, e.g., keeping score. In keeping with this view, his consulting firm, McBer & Company (1965–1989), had as its first motto "To make everyone productive, happy, and free". For McClelland, satisfaction lay in aligning peoples' lives with their fundamental motivations.

Elton Mayo (1880–1949) discovered the importance of the social contacts a worker has at the workplace and found that boredom and repetitiveness of tasks lead to reduced motivation. Mayo believed that workers could be motivated by acknowledging their social needs and making them feel important. As a result, employees were given the freedom to make decisions on-the-job and greater attention was paid to informal work-groups.

Mayo named his model the Hawthorne effect. His model has been judged as placing undue reliance on social contacts within work situations for motivating employees.

In 1981 William Ouchi introduced Theory Z, a hybrid management approach consisting of both Japanese and American philosophies and cultures. Its Japanese segment is much like the clan culture where organizations focus on a standardized structure with a heavy emphasis on socialization of its members. All underlying goals are consistent across the organization. Its American segment retains formality and authority amongst members and the organization. Ultimately, Theory Z promotes common structure and commitment to the organization, as well as constant improvement of work efficacy.

In Essentials of Organizational Behavior (2007), Robbins and Judge examine recognition programs as motivators, and identify five principles that contribute to the success of an employee incentive program:

 recognition of employees' individual differences, and clear identification of behavior deemed worthy of recognition
 allowing employees to participate
 linking rewards to performance
 rewarding of nominators
 visibility of the recognition process

Modern organizations which adopt non-monetary employee motivation methods rather than tying it with tangible rewards. When the reward is aimed at fulfilling employee contribution, participation, and individual satisfaction, it boosts their morale.

 Provide a positive work environment
 Encourage team contribution and rewards
 Feedback
 Give challenging roles

Job characteristics model

The Job characteristics Model (JCM), as designed by Hackman and Oldham attempts to use job design to improve employee motivation. They suggest that any job can be described in terms of five key job characteristics:
 Skill variety – the degree to which the job requires the use of different skills and talents
 Task identity – the degree to which the job has contributed to a clearly identifiable larger project
 Task significance – the degree to which the job affects the lives or work of other people
 Autonomy – the degree to which the worker has independence, freedom and discretion in carrying out the job
 Task feedback – the degree to which the worker is provided with clear, specific, detailed, actionable information about the effectiveness of his or her job performance

The JCM links the core job dimensions listed above to critical psychological states which results in desired personal and work outcomes. This forms the basis of this 'employee growth-need strength." The core dimensions listed above can be combined into a single predictive index, called the motivating potential score (MPS). The MPS can be calculated, using the core dimensions discussed above, as follows:

Jobs high in motivating potential must be high on both autonomy and feedback, and also must be high on at least one of the three factors that lead to experienced meaningfulness. If a job has a high MPS, the job characteristics model predicts motivation, performance, and job satisfaction will be positively affected and the likelihood of negative outcomes, such as absenteeism and turnover, will be reduced.

Employee recognition programs
Employee recognition is not only about gifts and points. It is about changing the corporate culture in order to meet goals and initiatives and most importantly to connect employees to the company's core values and beliefs. Strategic employee recognition is seen as the most important program not only to improve employee retention and motivation but also to positively influence the financial situation. The difference between the traditional approach (gifts and points) and strategic recognition is the ability to serve as a serious business influencer that can advance a company's strategic objectives in a measurable way. "The vast majority of companies want to be innovative, coming up with new products, business models, and better ways of doing things. However, innovation is not so easy to achieve. A CEO cannot just order it, and so it will be. You have to carefully manage an organization so that, over time, innovations will emerge."

Applications in education

Motivation is of particular interest to educational psychologists because of the crucial role it plays in student learning. However, the specific kind of motivation that is studied in the specialized setting of education differs qualitatively from the more general forms of motivation studied by psychologists in other fields.

Motivation in education can have several effects on how students learn and how they behave towards the subject matter. It can:
 Direct behavior toward particular goals
 Lead to increased effort and energy
 Increase initiation of, and persistence in, activities
 Enhance cognitive processing
 Determine what consequences are reinforcing
 Lead to improved performance.

Because students are not always internally motivated, they sometimes need situated motivation, which is found in environmental conditions that the teacher creates.

If teachers decided to extrinsically reward productive student behaviors, they may find it difficult to extricate themselves from that path. Consequently, student dependency on extrinsic rewards represents one of the greatest detractors from their use in the classroom.

The majority of new student orientation leaders at colleges and universities recognize that the distinctive needs of students should be considered in regard to orientation information provided at the beginning of the higher education experience. Research done by Whyte in 1986 raised the awareness of counselors and educators in this regard. In 2007, the National Orientation Directors Association reprinted Cassandra B. Whyte's research report allowing readers to ascertain improvements made in addressing specific needs of students over a quarter of a century later to help with academic success.

Generally, motivation is conceptualized as either intrinsic, actions driven by internal rewards, or extrinsic, actions driven by external rewards. Classically, these categories are regarded as distinct. Today, these concepts are less likely to be used as distinct categories, but instead as two ideal types that define a continuum:
 Intrinsic motivation occurs when people are internally motivated to do something because it either brings them pleasure, they think it is important, or they feel that what they are learning is significant. It has been shown that intrinsic motivation for education drops from grades 3–9, though the exact cause cannot be ascertained. Also, in younger students it has been shown that contextualizing material that would otherwise be presented in an abstract manner increases the intrinsic motivation of these students.
 Extrinsic motivation comes into play when a student is compelled to do something or act a certain way because of factors external to him or her (like meeting a goal, making more money or earning good grades). Extrinsic motivation can be increased by goal setting.

Whyte researched and reported about the importance of locus of control and academic achievement. Students tending toward a more internal locus of control are more academically successful, thus encouraging curriculum and activity development with consideration of motivation theories.

Academic motivation orientation may also be tied with one's ability to detect and process errors. Fisher, Nanayakkara, and Marshall conducted neuroscience research on children's motivation orientation, neurological indicators of error monitoring (the process of detecting an error), and academic achievement. Their research suggests that students with high intrinsic motivation attribute performance to personal control and that their error-monitoring system is more strongly engaged by performance errors. They also found that motivation orientation and academic achievement were related to the strength in which their error-monitoring system was engaged.

Motivation has been found to be an important element in the concept of andragogy (what motivates the adult learner), and in treating Autism Spectrum Disorders, as in pivotal response treatment.
Motivation has also been found critical in adolescents compliance to health suggestions, since "commitment requires belief in potentially negative and serious consequences of not acting."

Doyle and Moeyn have noted that traditional methods tended to use anxiety as negative motivation (e.g. use of bad grades by teachers) as a method of getting students to work. However, they have found that progressive approaches with focus on positive motivation over punishment has produced greater effectiveness with learning, since anxiety interferes with performance of complex tasks.

Symer et al. attempted to better define those in medical training programs who may have a "surgical personality". They evaluated a group of 801 first-year surgical interns to compare motivational traits amongst those who did and did not complete surgical training. There was no difference noted between the 80.5% who completed training when comparing their responses to the 19.5% who did not complete training using the validated Behavior Inhibitory System/Behavior Approach System. They concluded based on this that resident physician motivation is not associated with completion of a surgical training program.

It may appear that the reason some students are more engaged and perform better in class activities relative to other students is because some are more motivated than others. However, current research suggests that motivation is "dynamic, context sensitive, and changeable." Thus, students have the flexibility to alter their motivation for engaging in an activity or learning, even if they were not intrinsically motivated in the first place. While having this type of flexibility is important, research reveals that a teacher's teaching style and the school environment may play a factor in student motivation.

According to Sansone and Morgan, when students are already motivated to engage in an activity for their own personal pleasure and then a teacher provides the student with feedback, the type of feedback given can change the way that student views the activity and can even undermine their intrinsic motivation. Maclellan also looked at the relationship between tutors and students and in particular, and the type of feedback the tutor would give to the student. Maclellan's results showed that praise or criticism directed towards the student-generated a feeling of "fixed intelligence" while praise and criticism directed towards the effort and strategy used by the student generated a feeling of "malleable intelligence". In other words, feedback concerning effort and strategy leaves students knowing that there is room for growth. This is important because when students believe their intelligence is "fixed", their mindset can prevent skill development because students will believe that they only have a "certain amount" of understanding on a particular subject matter and might not even try. Therefore, it's crucial that a teacher is aware of how the feedback they give to their students can both positively and negatively impact the student's engagement and motivation.

In a correlational study, Katz and Shahar used a series of questionnaires and Likert-style scales and gave them to 100 teachers to see what makes a motivating teacher. Their results indicate that teachers who are intrinsically motivated to teach and believe that students should be taught in an autonomous style are the types of teachers that promote intrinsic motivation in the classroom. Deci, Sheinman, and Nezlek also found that when teachers adapted to an autonomous teaching style, students were positively affected and became more intrinsically motivated to achieve in the classroom. However, while the students were quick to adapt to the new teaching style, the impact was short-lived. Thus, teachers are limited in the way they teach by pressure to act, teach, and provide feedback in a certain way from the school district, administration, and guardians. Furthermore, even if students do have a teacher that promotes an autonomous teaching style, their overall school environment is also a factor because it can be extrinsically motivating. Examples of this would be posters around school promoting pizza parties for the highest grade point average or longer recess times for the classroom that brings more canned food donations.

Indigenous education and learning
For many indigenous students (such as Native American children), motivation may be derived from social organization; an important factor educators should account for in addition to variations in sociolinguistics and cognition. While poor academic performance among Native American students is often attributed to low levels of motivation, top-down classroom organization is often found to be ineffective for children of many cultures who depend on a sense of community, purpose, and competence in order to engage. Horizontally structured, community-based learning strategies often provide a more structurally supportive environment for motivating indigenous children, who tend to be driven by "social/affective emphasis, harmony, holistic perspectives, expressive creativity, and nonverbal communication." This drive is also traceable to a cultural tradition of community-wide expectations of participation in the activities and goals of the greater group, rather than individualized aspirations of success or triumph.

Also, in some indigenous communities, young children can often portray a sense of community-based motivation through their parent-like interactions with siblings. Furthermore, it is commonplace for children to assist and demonstrate for their younger counterparts without being prompted by authority figures. Observation techniques and integration methods are demonstrated in such examples as weaving in Chiapas, Mexico, where it is commonplace for children to learn from "a more skilled other" within the community. The child's real responsibility within the Mayan community can be seen in, for example, weaving apprenticeships; often, when the "more skilled other" is tasked with multiple obligations, an older child will step in and guide the learner. Sibling guidance is supported from early youth, where learning through play encourages horizontally structured environments through alternative educational models such as "Intent Community Participation." Research also suggests that formal Westernized schooling can actually reshape the traditionally collaborative nature of social life in indigenous communities. This research is supported cross-culturally, with variations in motivation and learning often reported higher between indigenous groups and their national Westernized counterparts than between indigenous groups across international continental divides.

Also, in some indigenous communities in the Americas, motivation is a driving force for learning. Children are incorporated and welcomed to participate in daily activities and thus feel motivated to participate due to them seeking a sense of belonging in their families and communities.

Children's participation is encouraged and their learning is supported by their community and family, furthering their motivation. Children are also trusted to be active contributors. Their active participation allows them to learn and gain skills that are valuable and useful in their communities.

As children transition from early childhood to middle childhood, their motivation to participate changes. In both the Indigenous communities of Quechua people and Rioja in Peru, children often experience a transition in which they become more included in their family's and community's endeavors. This changes their position and role in their families to more responsible ones and leads to an increase in their eagerness to participate and belong. As children go through this transition, they often develop a sense of identity within their family and community.

The transition from childhood to adolescence can be seen in the number of work children partake in as this changes over time. For example, Yucatec Mayan children's play time decreases from childhood to adolescence and as the child gets older, is replaced for time spent working. In childhood, the work is initiated by others, whereas in adolescence it is self-initiated. The shift in the initiation and the change in time spent working versus playing shows the children's motivation to participate in order to learn.

This transition between childhood and adolescence increases motivation because children gain social responsibility within their families. In some Mexican communities of Indigenous heritage, the contributions that children make within their community is essential to being social beings, establishes their developing roles, and also helps with developing their relationship with their family and community.

As children gain more roles and responsibilities within their families, their eagerness to participate also increases. For example, young Mayan children of San Pedro, Guatemala learn to work in the fields and family run businesses because they are motivated to contribute to their family. Many San Pedro women learned to weave by watching their mothers sew when they were children, sometimes earning their own wool through doing small tasks such as watching young children of busy mothers. Eager to learn and contribute, these young girls helped other members of their community in order to help their mothers with their weaving businesses or through other tasks such as helping carry water while young boys helped with tasks such as carrying firewood alongside their fathers.

Children's motivation to learn is not solely influenced by their desire to belong but also their eagerness to see their community succeed. Children from Navajo communities were shown to have higher levels of social concern than Anglo-American children in their schools. By having high levels of social concern the indigenous children are showing concern for not only their learning but also their peers, which serves as an example of their instilled sense of responsibility for their community. They wish to succeed as a united group rather than just themselves.

In order to be knowledgeable contributors, children must be aware of their surroundings and the community's goals. Children's learning in Indigenous-heritage communities is mainly based upon observing and helping out others in their community. Through this type of participation within their community, they gain purpose and motivation for the activity that they are doing within their community and become active participants because they know they are doing it for their community.

Applications in game design
Motivational models are central to game design, because without motivation, a player will not be interested in progressing further within a game. Several models for gameplay motivations have been proposed, including Richard Bartle's. Jon Radoff has proposed a four-quadrant model of gameplay motivation that includes cooperation, competition, immersion and achievement. The motivational structure of games is central to the gamification trend, which seeks to apply game-based motivation to business applications. In the end, game designers must know the needs and desires of their customers for their companies to flourish.

There have been various studies on the connection between motivation and games. One particular study was on Taiwanese adolescents and their drive of addiction to games. Two studies by the same people were conducted. The first study revealed that addicted players showed higher intrinsic than extrinsic motivation and more intrinsic motivation than the non-addicted players. It can then be said that addicted players, according to the studies' findings, are more internally motivated to play games. They enjoy the reward of playing. There are studies that also show that motivation gives these players more to look for in the future such as long-lasting experience that they may keep later on in life.

Applications in legal compliance
The findings on intrinsic motivation can be used to achieve legal compliance more effectively. Indeed, while the deterrence theory assumes that punishment will decrease the behavior, some empirical findings suggest a different view. This is based on the idea that fining a behavior puts a price on the violation and provides certainty as to the specific consequences of the violation. At the same time, the crowding out effect has been observed in whistleblowing practices, with the reward discouraging reports among highly internally motivated subjects. These findings indicate that an effective policy should make more use of tools such as advocacy and promoting compliance rather than relying exclusively on deterrence. For instance, corporate compliance programs can be a tool to build a stronger ethical culture within the company, thus increasing intrinsic motivation. However, rewarding them with fine reductions might have crowding-out effects.

See also 

 Adaptive performance
 Addiction
 Amotivational syndrome
 Effects of hormones on sexual motivation
 Employee engagement
 Enthusiasm
 Equity theory
 Frustration
 Happiness at work
 Health action process approach
 Hedonic motivation
 Humanistic psychology
 I-Change Model
 Incentives
 Learned industriousness
 Motivation crowding theory
 Motivational intensity
 Positive education
 Positive psychology in the workplace
 Regulatory focus theory
 Rubicon model (psychology)
 Work engagement
 Work motivation

References

Further reading 

 
 
 
 
 
 
 
 
 

 
Experimental psychology
Cognition